This is a list of earthquakes in Switzerland:

Earthquakes

References 

Sources

Earthquakes in Switzerland
Switzerland
Switzerland
Earthquakes